The constitutional oath of office of China was implemented on January 1, 2016 through a decision by the Standing Committee of the National People's Congress of China. The oath requirement applies to state civil servants elected or appointed by the National People's Congress and its Standing Committee at or above the county level.

Background and history
After the overthrow of the last imperial dynasty in 1911, the Republic of China was founded and an oath system was imposed with Sun Yat-sen taking the helm. The oath system continues today in Taiwan and is specified in Article 48 of the Constitution of the Republic of China.

Since the founding of the People's Republic of China in 1949, a constitutional oath system had never been established. Hong Kong and Macau each had oath systems prior to their return to the PRC, and both regions implemented oaths according to the Hong Kong Basic Law and Macau Basic Law, respectively, following China's resumption of sovereignty.

On December 4, 2012, in celebration of the 12th National Constitution Day and the 30th anniversary of the enactment of China's current constitution, the Ningbo Yinzhou District People's Court in Zhejiang province organized the first constitutional oath ceremony in the history of China's people's courts. Nine newly-appointed judges and 24 jurists participated in the ceremony while holding copies of the constitution.

On October 23, 2014, the Fourth Plenum of the 18th Central Committee of the Chinese Communist Party passed the Decision of the Central Committee of the Communist Party of China Regarding Several Major Issues in the Promotion of the Rule of Law, which proposed "establishing a constitutional oath system, such that all state civil servants elected or appointed by the National People's Congress or its Standing Committee publicly swear an oath to the constitution upon formally taking office."

On July 1, 2015, the 15th Meeting of the 12th Standing Committee of the National People's Congress passed the Decision of the National People's Congress Standing Committee Regarding the Implementation of a Constitutional Oath System, with an effective date of January 1, 2016. The Decision requires state civil servants elected or appointed by the National People's Congress, its Standing Committee, the State Council, the Central Military Commission, the Supreme People's Court, the Supreme People's Procuratorate, and other central government organs, as well as equivalent local government organs at or above the county level, to publicly swear an oath to the constitution upon formally taking office.

On February 23, 2018, the 33rd Meeting of the 12th Standing Committee of the National People's Congress revised the Decision that instituted the constitutional oath. The constitutional oath's last phrase was changed to "to work for a great modern socialist country that is prosperous, strong, democratic, culturally advanced, harmonious, and beautiful." In addition, the Decision expanded the oath-taking requirement to include members of the newly-created National Supervisory Commission, and required the national anthem to be played at the oath taking ceremony.

Ceremony

The Decision allows for the oath to be taken individually or in a group. If taken individually, the oath taker places his or her left hand on a copy of the Constitution, and raises his or her right hand in a fist. If taken in a group, one person leads the ceremony, with his or her left hand on a copy of the Constitution and his or her right hand raised in a fist. The other oath takers stand in a line with their right hands raised in a fist, and recite the oath along with the leader. The ceremony is to be "dignified" and "solemn," and the Chinese flag or the National Emblem of China. The National Anthem of the People's Republic of China must also be played at the ceremony.

Oath

People's Republic of China
As prescribed by the decision in 2016:

Unofficial English translation:

A revised version was used in 2018:

Unofficial English translation:

See also 
 Chinese Communist Party Admission Oath

References 

1912 establishments in China
1912 in law
1947 establishments in China
1947 in law
2016 establishments in China
2016 in law
Oaths
Constitution of China